Invisible Threads is an album by English saxophonist and composer John Surman recorded in Norway in 2017 and released on the ECM label the following year.

Reception

The PopMatters review by Steve Horowitz stated "This is jazz meant for a quiet room. The trio creates a space where a listener can drift along without getting tired. There's an energy to the playing that lifts one into a pleasant state and a good-humor to the enterprise as a whole. The mutual respect the musicians have for each other is evident by the space in which they give themselves to play. The silence between the instruments and the attentive pacing in which they perform suggests they are carefully listening to each other rather than just waiting for their turn".

The AllMusic review by Thom Jurek notes "As a whole, Invisible Threads is an approachable but major work of melodic improvisation and tonal inquiry".

All About Jazz reviewer Samuel Stroup said, "This band of veteran musicians achieves what it sets out to do on Invisible Threads, mixing their improvisational skill with the rhythmic intricacies that make the album's songs unique. The trio's light sound never becomes flimsy, each member occupying his varying amount of authority, moment by moment. Surman masterfully leads the group through his exercises in cohesion in the flowing and pulsing music".

Track listing
All compositions by John Surman except where noted
 "At First Sight" – 2:33
 "Autumn Nocturne" – 6:52
 "Within the Clouds" – 4:48
 "Byndweed" – 5:11
 "On Still Waters" – 4:45
 "Another Reflection" – 1:33
 "The Admiral" – 5:15
 "Pitanga Pitomba" – 7:06
 "Summer Song" (Nelson Ayres) – 5:22
 "Concentric Circles" – 6:32
 "Stoke Damerel" – 3:37
 "Invisible Threads" – 5:39

Personnel
 John Surman – soprano saxophone, baritone saxophone, bass clarinet
  – piano
 Rob Waring – vibraphone, marimba

References

2018 albums
John Surman albums
ECM Records albums
Albums produced by Manfred Eicher